The 2001 NCAA Division I men's basketball tournament involved 65 schools playing in single-elimination play to determine the national champion of men's  NCAA Division I college basketball for the 2000–01 NCAA Division I men's basketball season. It began on March 13, 2001, with the play-in game, and ended with the championship game on April 2 in Minneapolis, at the Metrodome. A total of 64 games were played.

This tournament is the first to feature 65 teams, due to the Mountain West Conference receiving an automatic bid for the first time. This meant that 31 conferences would have automatic bids to the tournament. The NCAA decided to maintain 34 at-large bids, which necessitated a play-in game between the #64 and #65 ranked teams, with the winner playing against a #1 seed in the first round. (Another option would have been to reduce the number of at-large bids to 33, which was the option chosen for the women's tournament.) This is also the first tournament to have been broadcast in high-definition, being broadcast on CBS.

This was the last tournament where the first- and second-round sites were tied to specific regionals. The "pod system" was instituted for the 2002 tournament to keep as many teams as possible closer to their campus in the first two rounds.

The Final Four consisted of Duke, making their second appearance in the Final Four in three years, Maryland, making their first appearance, Michigan State, the defending national champions, and Arizona, making their first appearance since winning the national championship in 1997.

Duke defeated Arizona 82–72 in the national championship game to win their third national title and first since 1992. Shane Battier of Duke was named the tournament's Most Outstanding Player.

Schedule and venues

The following are the sites that were selected to host each round of the 2001 tournament:

Opening Round
March 13
University of Dayton Arena, Dayton, Ohio (Host: University of Dayton)

First and Second Rounds
March 15 and 17
East Region
 Greensboro Coliseum, Greensboro, North Carolina (Host: Atlantic Coast Conference)
 Nassau Veterans Memorial Coliseum, Uniondale, New York (Hosts: Hofstra University, America East Conference)
West Region
 BSU Pavilion, Boise, Idaho (Host: Boise State University)
 Cox Arena, San Diego, California (Host: San Diego State University)
March 16 and 18
Midwest Region
 University of Dayton Arena, Dayton, Ohio (Host: University of Dayton)
 Kemper Arena, Kansas City, Missouri (Host: Big 12 Conference)
South Region
 Memphis Pyramid, Memphis, Tennessee (Host: University of Memphis)
 Louisiana Superdome, New Orleans, Louisiana (Hosts: Sun Belt Conference, University of New Orleans)

Regional semifinals and finals (Sweet Sixteen and Elite Eight)
March 22 and 24
East Regional, First Union Center, Philadelphia, Pennsylvania (Host: Atlantic 10 Conference)
West Regional, Arrowhead Pond of Anaheim, Anaheim, California (Host: Big West Conference)
March 23 and 25
Midwest Regional, Alamodome, San Antonio, Texas (Host: University of Texas at San Antonio)
South Regional, Georgia Dome, Atlanta, Georgia (Host: Georgia Institute of Technology)

National semifinals and championship (Final Four and championship)
March 31 and April 2
Hubert H. Humphrey Metrodome, Minneapolis, Minnesota (Host: University of Minnesota)

Qualifying teams

Automatic bids
The following teams were automatic qualifiers for the 2001 NCAA field by virtue of winning their conference's tournament (except for the Ivy League and Pac-10, whose regular-season champions received their automatic bids).

Listed by region and seeding

Bids by conference

Bids by conference

Final Four
At Hubert H. Humphrey Metrodome, Minneapolis, Minnesota

National semifinals
March 31, 2001
Duke (E1) 95, Maryland (W3) 84
The fourth meeting of the year between ACC rivals Duke and Maryland – both road teams won during the ACC regular season before Duke won 84–82 in the ACC Tournament semifinals in Atlanta en route to winning the tournament – turned into a classic. Maryland jumped out of the gate to an early 39–17 lead. It appeared the Terps would eliminate Duke, led by senior Shane Battier. However, Duke was able to cut the lead at halftime to 49–38. Duke would take its first lead when Jason Williams drained a three to give Duke the lead 73–72 with 6:48 to play. Duke closed the game with a 23–12 run to stun Gary Williams' Maryland squad. Referees: David Libbey, Mark Reischling, and Ted Hillary.
Arizona (M2) 80, Michigan State (S1) 61
 In an emotional season in which Arizona coach Lute Olson suffered the loss of his wife Bobbi, he would be just 40 minutes away from a second National Championship after his Wildcats destroyed the defending national champion Michigan State Spartans. The game was close at halftime with Arizona leading by just 2. However, Arizona outscored Michigan State 48–31 in the second half en route to the 19-point victory.

Championship game

April 2, 2001
Duke (E1) 82, Arizona (M2) 72
The second-ranked team coming into the NCAA tournament would leave giving coach Mike Krzyzewski his third National Championship at Duke. Arizona cut Duke's lead to 39–37 early in the second half, but Mike Dunleavy Jr. connected on three three-pointers during an 11–2 Duke run. Dunleavy Jr. led the Duke Blue Devils with 21 points. The Arizona Wildcats would cut the gap to 3 four times, twice inside the four-minute TV timeout. However, Shane Battier proved himself too much for the Wildcats to handle as he hit two critical shots to put the Blue Devils comfortably ahead. Jason Williams, despite a poor shooting night, iced the game with a three-pointer from the top of the key with under 2 minutes to play to give Duke an eight-point lead. The final score was Duke 82 – Arizona 72.

Bracket
* – Denotes overtime period

Opening Round game – Dayton, Ohio
Winner advances to 16th seed in Midwest Regional vs. (1) Illinois.

East regional — Philadelphia, Pennsylvania

West regional — Anaheim, California

South regional — Atlanta, Georgia

Midwest regional — San Antonio, Texas

Final Four — Minneapolis, Minnesota

Upsets

This tournament featured many upsets in the first two rounds, with two #13 seeds and two #12 seeds winning in the first. The best remembered and most unexpected occurred when Hampton beat number 2 seed Iowa State 58–57 in the first round. The Pirates were down by as much as 11 in the game and outscored the Cyclones 10–0 in the final seven minutes of the game. Tarvis Williams made the winning shot with 6.9 seconds left. The video of Hampton coach Steve Merfield being lifted in the air by player David Johnson during the celebration has become a classic clip, often played by CBS and ESPN to showcase the excitement of the underdog in the NCAA tournament.

Hampton became only the fourth #15 seed to win a game since the tournament expanded to 64 teams in 1985 and the first since 1997. They went on to lose to Georgetown in the second round, failing to become the first seed that low to make the Round of 16. The Pirates were the last #15 seed to advance in the tournament until 2012, in which two #15 seeds beat their #2-seeded opponents.

12-seed Gonzaga also made the Sweet 16 for the third year in a row, all as a double digit seed.

Announcers
Jim Nantz/Billy Packer/Bonnie Bernstein – First & Second Round at New Orleans, Louisiana; East Regional at Philadelphia, Pennsylvania; Final Four at Minneapolis, Minnesota
Dick Enberg and Bill Walton – First & Second Round at San Diego, California; Midwest Regional at San Antonio, Texas
Verne Lundquist and Bill Raftery – First & Second Round at Kansas City, Missouri; South Regional at Atlanta, Georgia
Gus Johnson and Dan Bonner – First & Second Round at Uniondale, New York; West Regional at Anaheim, California
Kevin Harlan/Jon Sundvold/Charles Davis – First & Second Round at Greensboro, North Carolina
Ian Eagle/Jim Spanarkel/Brett Haber – First & Second Round at Memphis, Tennessee
Tim Brando/Rick Pitino/Spencer Tillman – First & Second Round at Dayton, Ohio
Craig Bolerjack/James Worthy/Bob Wenzel – First & Second Round at Boise, Idaho

See also
 2001 NCAA Division II men's basketball tournament
 2001 NCAA Division III men's basketball tournament
 2001 NCAA Division I women's basketball tournament
 2001 NCAA Division II women's basketball tournament
 2001 NCAA Division III women's basketball tournament
 2001 National Invitation Tournament
 2001 Women's National Invitation Tournament
 2001 NAIA Division I men's basketball tournament
 2001 NAIA Division II men's basketball tournament
 2001 NAIA Division I women's basketball tournament
 2001 NAIA Division II women's basketball tournament

References

NCAA Division I men's basketball tournament
Ncaa
NCAA Division I men's basketball tournament
NCAA Division I men's basketball tournament
NCAA Division I men's basketball tournament
Basketball in San Antonio